The Chapel of the Immaculate Conception is a Roman Catholic chapel on Bajja 'ta Spinola in St Julian's, Malta. It was built as the church for the Spinola Palace nearby and dedicated to the Immaculate Conception.

The chapel was built by Fra Paolo Rafel Spinola in close proximity to his palace. The chapel was completed in 1687 and enlarged at the beginning of the 20th century. A new façade was added to the chapel in 1914. It is listed on the National Inventory of the Cultural Property of the Maltese Islands. The first stone of the church was laid on 16 June 1687, and it was consecrated on 10 September 1688.

References

External links

National Inventory of the Cultural Property of the Maltese Islands
Roman Catholic chapels in Malta
Roman Catholic churches completed in 1688
St. Julian's, Malta
17th-century Roman Catholic church buildings in Malta